Russian Ballerina is a 1947 Soviet film directed by Aleksandr Ivanovsky.

Plot 
A graduate of the choreographic school is looking for a new style for the part in the ballet The Sleeping Beauty. A student of the Conservatory Aleksey  falls in love with a young ballerina.

Cast
 Mira Redina as Natasha Subbotina  
 Viktor Kazanovich as Aleksey Ozerov  
 Olga Zhiznyeva as Nelidova, Ballet Teacher  
 Vladimir Gardin as Lyubomirsky
 Galina Ulanova as Prima Ballerina Sinelnikova  
 Vladimir Preobrazhenskiy as Sinelnikova's partner  
 Nonna Yastrebova as Olga Vereyskaya  
 Nina Boldyreva as Olga's mother  
 Konstantin Adashevsky as Olga's father
 Aleksandra Trishko as Natasha's grandmother
 Tatyana Piletskaya as episode

References

External links 
 

1947 films
1940s Russian-language films
Films about ballet
Soviet black-and-white films
Lenfilm films
Soviet musical films
1947 musical films